A Gentleman's Dignity is a 2012 South Korean romantic comedy television series starring Jang Dong-gun, Kim Ha-neul, Kim Su-ro, Kim Min-jong,  and Lee Jong-hyuk. It aired on SBS from May 26 to August 12, 2012 on Saturdays and Sundays at 21:55 for 20 episodes.

The series marked Jang Dong-gun's return to television after twelve years. It was directed by Shin Woo-chul and written by Kim Eun-sook, the same team behind hit dramas Secret Garden, On Air, Lovers in Prague, and Lovers in Paris.

Synopsis 
A Gentleman's Dignity is about the careers and love lives of urban professionals. It tells the story of four men in their forties who have been friends since they were eighteen, as they go through love, breakup, success and failure.

Kim Do-jin is a confident playboy who meets Seo Yi-soo and falls for her. To his surprise, she doesn't give him the time of day and he discovers that she has a crush on his best friend Im Tae-san. He begins a one-sided love for the first time in his life and tries to win her heart.

Im Tae-san starts dating Yi-soo's roommate, Hong Se-ra, but troubles arise when Yi-soo's crush is revealed and when Se-ra tells him she doesn't want to get married.

Choi Yoon is a lawyer who is still recovering from his wife's death four years ago but begins to have feelings for Tae-san's much younger sister, Im Meari. Meari has always had a crush on Yoon. However, Yoon refuses to give into his feelings and jeopardize his friendship with Tae-san.

Lee Jung-rok is married to a rich woman, Park Min-sook, but constantly flirts with other women which causes problems and trust issues in their marriage.

Meanwhile, a teenager named Colin comes to Korea looking for the four men and claims one of them is his biological father.

Cast

Main

 Jang Dong-gun as Kim Do-jin  
A confident ladies' man who heads his own architectural firm with Im Tae-san. Do-jin has a memory loss problem in times of stress and records everything in his daily life with a voice recorder pen. He loves his car and named it "Betty".

 Kim Ha-neul as Seo Yi-soo  
A high school ethics teacher who also umpires amateur baseball games in her free time. Yi-soo has had a secret crush on Tae-san for three years.
 Kim Soo-ro as Im Tae-san  
A partner at Do-jin's firm, heading the construction division. He a member of the Blue Cats baseball team, and long-time friend of Yi-soo.

 Kim Min-jong as Choi Yoon 
A lawyer who is still recovering from his wife's death four years ago and a member of the Blue Cats baseball team.

 Lee Jong-hyuk as Lee Jung-rok 
Owner of a Mango Six cafe and a bar. He is married to a rich woman, Park Min-sook, but constantly flirts with other women.

Supporting
 Yoon Se-ah as Hong Se-ra  
A pro golfer. She is Tae-san's girlfriend and Yi-soo's roommate.

 Kim Jung-nan as Park Min-sook  
Jung-rok's extremely wealthy wife.

 Yoon Jin-yi as Im Me Ah-ri 
Tae-san's younger sister and Yi-soo's past student. Meari came back to Korea after studying in America and has an interest in bag design. She has had a crush on Yoon for a long time.

 Lee Jong-hyun as Colin 
An American-born Korean who comes to Korea, claiming that one of the four guys is his biological father. He develops a crush on Meari.

Kim Woo-bin as Kim Dong-hyub
A student of Yi-soo who often gets into trouble at school. He has a crush on Yi-soo. 
Park Joo-mi as Kim Eun-hee
Colin's mother and the first love of the four guys.
Nam Hyun-joo as Teacher Park
Park Ah-in as Attorney Kang
Yoon Joo-man as Team leader Choi
Min Jae-sik as Mango Six Cafe's manager
Kim Chang-seong as Sang-hyun
Kim Geun as Kim Geun, Hwa Dam's employee
Lee Joon-hee as Kwon, Hwa Dam's employee
Jo Hyeon-gyu as Hyeon-gyu, Hwa Dam's employee
Han Eun Sun as Young-ran, Hwa Dam's employee
Ahn Jae-min as Yoo Seong-jae
Kim Yoon-seo as Kim Eun-ji, Do-jin's ex-girlfriend
Lee Yong-yi as Lee Mi-kyung, Yoon's mother-in-law 
Kim Sun-hwa as Director Song

Special appearances
Sa-hee as Do-jin's seducer in the pub in (ep 1)
Ahn Hye-kyeong as Yoon's client (ep 2 and 10)
Shin Hye-jeong as Na Jong-seok's daughter (ep 3)  
Choi Sung-jo as Min-sook's fitness trainer (ep 3)
Kim Kwang-kyu as High school teacher (ep 4)
Choi Soo-young as herself (ep. 5) 
Hwang Eun-soo as Hong Se-ra's golfing junior (ep 9 and 12)
Kim Dong-gyun as Na Jong-seok (ep 11)
Jung Yong-hwa as himself and a past student of Yi-soo (ep 13) 
Juniel as street performer at Hongdae playground (ep 13)
Kim Sung-oh as army instructor (ep 15)
Jang Joon-yoo as Tae-san's blind date (ep 16)
Cha Hwa-yeon as Yi-soo's mother (ep 16 and 19)
Bae Ji-hyun as reporter (ep 20)

Prologues 
A unique feature of this drama is at the beginning of every episode, a prologue (or cold open) is shown. The prologues involve anecdotes about Do-jin, Tae-san, Yoon and Jung-rok's friendship through the years, and they carry a humorous tone with the exception of episode 16's. The prologues are not related narratively to the previous episode's ending or the present storyline, however they underline each episode's theme.

Original soundtrack 
The drama has released seven parts of the soundtrack in two OST albums, the first part is "High High" by Kim Tae-woo and the second part features various artists including Jeon Geun-hwa with single "Beautiful Words", Kyung-woo with single "When I Look At You" and Park Eun-ooh with single "Everyday". Actors Jang Dong-gun, Lee Jong-hyun and Kim Min-jong also contributed songs to the soundtrack included in A Gentleman's Dignity OST 2.

Ratings

Awards and nominations

Novel
A two-part novelization was published in August 2012.

References

External links
  
 
 

Korean-language television shows
2012 South Korean television series debuts
2012 South Korean television series endings
Seoul Broadcasting System television dramas
South Korean romantic comedy television series
Television shows written by Kim Eun-sook
Television series by Hwa&Dam Pictures
Television series by CJ E&M